The Nicaraguan Revolution encompassed the rising opposition to the Somoza dictatorship in the 1960s and 1970s, the campaign led by the Sandinista National Liberation Front (FSLN) to oust the dictatorship in 1978–79, the subsequent efforts of the FSLN to govern Nicaragua from 1979 to 1990, and the Contra War, which was waged between the FSLN-led government of Nicaragua and the United States–backed Contras from 1981 to 1990. The revolution marked a significant period in the history of Nicaragua and revealed the country as one of the major proxy war battlegrounds of the Cold War, attracting much international attention.

The initial overthrow of the Somoza regime in 1978–79 was a dirty affair, and the Contra War of the 1980s took the lives of tens of thousands of Nicaraguans and was the subject of fierce international debate. Because of the political turmoil, failing economy, and decreasing government influence, during the 1980s both the FSLN (a leftist collection of political parties) and the Contras (a rightist collection of counter-revolutionary groups) received large amounts of aid from the Cold War superpowers (respectively, the Soviet Union and the United States).

A peace process started with the Sapoá Accords in 1988 and the Contra War ended after the signing of the Tela Accord in 1989 and the demobilization of the FSLN and Contra armies. A second election in 1990 resulted in the election of a majority of anti-Sandinista parties and the FSLN handing over power.

Background

Following the United States occupation of Nicaragua in 1912 during the Banana Wars, the Somoza family political dynasty came to power, and would rule Nicaragua from 1937 until their ouster in 1979 during the Nicaraguan Revolution. The Somoza dynasty consisted of Anastasio Somoza García, his eldest son Luis Somoza Debayle, and finally Anastasio Somoza Debayle. The era of Somoza family rule was characterized by economic development albeit with rising inequality and political corruption, strong US support for the government and its military, as well as a reliance on US-based multinational corporations.

Rise of the FSLN
In 1961 Carlos Fonseca Amador, Silvio Mayorga, and Tomás Borge Martínez formed the FSLN (Sandinista National Liberation Front) with other student activists at the Universidad Nacional Autonoma de Nicaragua (UNAN) in Managua. For the founding members of the FSLN, this was not their first experience with political activism. Amador, first General Secretary of the organization, had worked with others on a newspaper "broadly critical" of the Somoza reign titled Segovia.

Consisting of approximately 20 members during the 1960s, with the help of students, the organization gathered support from peasants and anti-Somoza elements within Nicaraguan society, as well as from the communist Cuban government, and the socialist Panamanian government of Omar Torrijos, and the social democratic Venezuelan government of Carlos Andrés Pérez.

By the 1970s the coalition of students, farmers, businesses, churches, and a small percentage of Marxists was strong enough to launch a military effort against the regime of longtime dictator Anastasio Somoza Debayle. The FSLN focused on guerrilla tactics almost immediately, inspired by the campaigns of Fidel Castro and Ché Guevara. Penetrating the Northern coast of Nicaragua, the Río Coco/Bocay-Raití campaign was largely a failure: "when guerrillas did encounter the National Guard, they had to retreat...with heavy losses." Further operations included a devastating loss near the city of Matagalpa, during which Mayorga was killed, which led Fonseca to a "prolonged period of reflection, self-criticism and ideological debate." During this time, the FSLN reduced attacks, instead focusing on solidifying the organization as a whole.

Fonseca died in combat in November of 1976. After his death, the FSLN split into three factions which fought separately: Tendencia GPP (Guerra Popular Prolongada) (English: Prolonged People's War), which followed Maoist ideas; Tendencia Proletaria (English: proletarian), which followed Marxist-Leninist ideas; and Tendencia Tercerista (English: third), which pursued politically left-wing nationalism, social democracy, and liberation theology.

Overthrow of the Somoza regime

In the 1970s the FSLN began a campaign of kidnappings which led to national recognition of the group in the Nicaraguan media and solidification of the group as a force in opposition to the Somoza Regime. The Somoza Regime, which included the Nicaraguan National Guard, a force highly trained by the U.S. military, declared a state of siege, and proceeded to use torture, extrajudicial killings, intimidation and censorship of the press in order to combat the FSLN attacks. This led to international condemnation of the regime and in 1978 the administration of U.S. president Jimmy Carter cut off aid to the Somoza regime due to its human rights violations (Boland Amendment). In response, Somoza lifted the state of siege in order to continue receiving aid.

Other opposition parties and movements also started a process of consolidation. In 1974, Unión Democrática Liberal (UDEL) was founded by Pedro Joaquín Chamorro Cardenal; the alliance included two anti-Somoza liberal parties as well as some conservatives and even the Nicaraguan Socialist Party.

On 10 January 1978, the editor of the Managua newspaper La Prensa, and founder of the Union for Democratic Liberation (UDEL), Pedro Joaquín Chamorro Cardenal was murdered by suspected elements of the Somoza regime, and riots broke out in the capital city, Managua, targeting the Somoza regime. Following the riots, a general strike on 23–24 January called for the end of the Somoza regime and was, according to the U.S. State Department staff at the U.S. Embassy, successful at shutting down around 80% of businesses in not only Managua but also the provincial capitals of León, Granada, Chinandega, and Matagalpa.

In the words of William Dewy, an employee of Citi Bank who witnessed the riots in Managua:

On 22 August 1978 the FSLN staged a massive kidnapping operation. Led by Éden Pastora, the Sandinistan forces captured the National Palace while the legislature was in session, taking 2,000 hostages. Pastora demanded money, the release of Sandinistan prisoners, and, "a means of publicizing the Sandinista cause." After two days, the government agreed to pay $500,000 and to release certain prisoners, marking a major victory for the FSLN. Revolts against the state continued as the Sandinistas received material support from Venezuela and Panama. Further support would stem from Cuba in the form of "arms and military advising."

In early 1979 the Organization of American States supervised negotiations between the FSLN and the government. However, these broke down when it became clear that the Somoza regime had no intention of allowing democratic elections to take place.

By June 1979 the FSLN controlled all of the country except the capital, and on 17 July President Somoza resigned and the FSLN entered Managua, giving full control of the government to the revolutionary movements. Somoza fled to Miami, his Nationalist Liberal Party became practically "decapacitated" and many of its functionaries as well as business figures overtly compromised with somocismo chose the exile. The Catholic church and the professional sectors generally approved of the new reality.

Sandinista government
Immediately following the fall of the Somoza regime, Nicaragua was largely in ruins. The country had suffered both war and, earlier, natural disaster in the devastating 1972 Nicaragua earthquake. In 1979, approximately 600,000 Nicaraguans were homeless and 150,000 were either refugees or in exile, out of a total population of just 2.8 million.

In response to these issues, a state of emergency was declared. President Carter sent US$99 million in aid. Land and businesses of the Somoza regime were expropriated, the old courts were abolished, and workers were organized into Civil Defense Committees. The new regime also declared that "elections are unnecessary", which led to criticism from the Catholic Church, among others.

Economic reforms

The Revolution ended the burden the Somocista regime had imposed upon the Nicaraguan economy and which had seriously deformed the country, creating a big and modern center, Managua, where Somoza's power had emanated to all corners of the territory. Somoza had developed an almost semifeudalist rural economy with few productive goods, such as cotton, sugar and other tropical agricultural products. All sectors of the economy of Nicaragua were determined, in great part if not entirely, by the Somozas or the officials and others surrounding the regime, whether by directly owning agricultural brands and trusts, or actively putting them into local or foreign hands. It is famously stated that Somoza himself owned 1/5 of all profitable land in Nicaragua. While this is not correct, Somoza or his adepts did own or give away banks, ports, communications, services and massive amounts of land.

The Nicaraguan Revolution brought immense restructuring and reforms to all three sectors of the economy, directing it towards a mixed economy system. The biggest economic impact was on the primary sector, agriculture, in the form of the Agrarian Reform, which was not proposed as something that could be planned in advanced from the beginning of the Revolution but as a process that would develop pragmatically along with the other changes (economic, political, etc.) that would arise during the Revolution period.

Economic reforms overall needed to rescue out of limbo the inefficient and helpless Nicaraguan economy. As a "third-world" country, Nicaragua had, and has, an agriculture-based economy, undeveloped and susceptible to the flow of market prices for its agricultural goods, such as coffee and cotton. The Revolution faced a rural economy well behind in technology and, at the same time, devastated by the guerrilla warfare and the soon to come civil war against the Contras.

Article 1 of the Agrarian Reform Law says that property is guaranteed if it laboured efficiently and that there could be different forms of property:
state property (with the confiscated land from somocistas)
cooperative property (part of confiscated land, but without individual certificates of ownership, to be laboured efficiently)
communal property (in response to reinvindication from people and communities from Miskito regions in the Atlantic)
individual property (as long as this is efficiently exploited and integrated to national plans of development)

The principles that presided Agrarian Reform were the same ones for the Revolution: pluralism, national unity and economic democracy.

The Nicaraguan Agrarian Reform developed into four phases:
 phase (1979): confiscation of property owned by Somocistas and its adepts
 phase (1981): Agrarian Reform Law of 19 July 1981
 phase (1984–85): massive cession of land individually, responding to demands from peasantry
 phase (1986): Agrarian Reform Law of 1986, or "reform to the 1981 Law"

In 1985, the Agrarian Reform distributed  of land to the peasantry. This represented about 75 percent of all land distributed to peasants since 1980. According to Project, the agrarian reform had the twofold purpose of increasing the support for the government among the campesinos, and guaranteeing ample food delivery into the cities. During 1985, ceremonies were held throughout the countryside in which Daniel Ortega would give each peasant a title to the land and a rifle to defend it.

Cultural Revolution
The Nicaraguan Revolution brought many cultural improvements and developments. Undoubtedly, the most important was the planning and execution of the Nicaraguan Literacy Campaign (Cruzada Nacional de Alfabetización). The literacy campaign used secondary school students, university students as well as teachers as volunteer teachers. Within five months they reduced the overall illiteracy rate from 50.3% to 12.9%. As a result, in September 1980, UNESCO awarded Nicaragua with the "Nadezhda K. Krupskaya" award for their successful literacy campaign. This was followed by the literacy campaigns of 1982, 1986, 1987, 1995 and 2000, all of which were also awarded by UNESCO. The Revolution also founded a Ministry of Culture, one of only three in Latin America at the time, and established a new editorial brand, called Editorial Nueva Nicaragua and, based on it, started to print cheap editions of basic books rarely seen by Nicaraguans at all. It also founded an Instituto de Estudios del Sandinismo (Institute for Studies of Sandinismo) where it printed all of the work and papers of Augusto C. Sandino and those that cemented the ideologies of FSLN as well, such as Carlos Fonseca, Ricardo Morales Avilés and others. The key large scale programs of the Sandinistas received international recognition for their gains in literacy, health care, education, childcare, unions, and land reform.

Human rights controversies 

The Heritage Foundation, a conservative American think tank with close ties to the Reagan administration, charged the Sandinista government with numerous human rights violations, including censorship of the press and repression of the country's Miskito and Jewish populations. It charged that the government censored the independent newspaper La Prensa, though French journalist Viktor Dedaj, who lived in Managua in the 1980s, contended that La Prensa was generally sold freely and that the majority of radio stations were anti-Sandinista. The Heritage Foundation also claimed that the Sandinistas instituted a "spy on your neighbor" system that encouraged citizens to report any activity deemed counter-revolutionary, with those reported facing harassment from security representatives, including the destruction of property.

The Heritage Foundation also criticized the government for its treatment of the Miskito people, stating that over 15,000 Miskitos were forced to relocate, their villages were destroyed, and their killers were promoted rather than punished. The Los Angeles Times also noted that "...the Miskitos began to actively oppose the Sandinistas in 1982 when authorities killed more than a dozen Indians, burned villages, forcibly recruited young men into the army and tried to relocate others. Thousands of Miskitos poured across the Coco into Honduras, and many took up U.S.-supplied arms to oppose the Nicaraguan government."

The United Nations, the Organization of American States and Pax Christi disputed the Foundation's allegations of anti-Semitism. According to them, individual Nicaraguan Jews had their property expropriated due to their connections with the Somoza regime, but not because they were Jewish. They cited the fact that there were prominent Sandinistas officials of Jewish descent. In contrast to these organizations, the Anti-Defamation League supported the Reagan administration's allegations of Sandinista anti-semitism. It worked closely with Nicaraguan Jewish exiles to reclaim a synagogue that had been firebombed by Sandinista militants in 1978 and expropriated by the Sandinista government in 1979.

Amnesty International also noted numerous human rights violations by the Sandinista government. Among what they found: they contended that civilians "disappeared" after their arrest, that "civil and political rights" were suspended, due process was denied detainees, torture of detainees, and "reports of the killing by government forces of those suspected of supporting the contras".

The Sandinistas were also accused of mass executions. The Inter-American Commission on Human Rights investigated abuses by Sandinista forces, including an execution of 35 to 40 Miskitos in December 1981, and an execution of 75 people in November 1984.

Contra War

Although the Carter Administration had attempted to work with FSLN in 1979 and 1980, the more right-wing Reagan Administration supported a strong anti-communist strategy for dealing with Latin America, and so it attempted to isolate the Sandinista regime. As early as 1980–1981 an anti-Sandinista movement, the Contrarrevolución (Counter-revolution) or just Contras, was forming along the border with Honduras. Many of the initial Contras were former members of the Somoza regime's National Guard unit and many were still loyal to Somoza, who was living in exile in Honduras.

In addition to the Contra units who continued to be loyal to Somoza, the FSLN also began to face opposition from members of the ethnic minority groups that inhabited Nicaragua's remote Mosquito Coast region along the Caribbean Sea. These groups were demanding a larger share of self-determination and/or autonomy, but the FSLN refused to grant this and began using forced relocations and armed force in response to these grievances.

Upon taking office in January 1981, Ronald Reagan cancelled the dispersal of economic aid to Nicaragua, and on 6 August 1981 he signed National Security Decision Directive number 7, which authorized the production and shipment of arms to the region but not their deployment. On 17 November 1981, President Reagan signed National Security Directive 17, authorizing covert support to anti-Sandinista forces.

An armed conflict soon arose, adding to the destabilization of the region which had been unfolding through the Central American civil wars in El Salvador and Guatemala. The Contras, heavily backed by the CIA, secretly opened a "second front" on Nicaragua's Atlantic coast and Costa Rican border.  With the civil war opening up cracks in the national revolutionary project, the FSLN's military budget grew to more than half of the annual budget. The Servicio Militar Patriótico (Patriotic Military Service), a compulsory draft, was also established.

By 1982 Contra forces had begun carrying out assassinations of members of the Nicaraguan government, and by 1983 the Contras had launched a major offensive and the CIA was helping them to plant mines in Nicaragua's harbors to prevent foreign weapons shipments from arriving. The 1987 Iran–Contra affair placed the Reagan Administration again at the center of secret support for the Contras.

1984 general election

The 1984 election took place on 4 November. Of the 1,551,597 citizens registered in July, 1,170,142 voted (75.41%). The null votes were 6% of the total. International observers declared the elections free and fair, despite the Reagan administration denouncing it as a "Soviet style sham". The national averages of valid votes for president were:
 Daniel Ortega, Sandinista National Liberation Front (FSLN) – 66.97%
 Clemente Guido, Democratic Conservative Party (PCD) – 14.04%
 Virgilio Godoy, Independent Liberal Party (PLI) – 9.60%
 Mauricio Diaz, Popular Social Christian Party (PPSC) – 5.56%
 Allan Zambrana, Nicaraguan Communist Party (PCdeN) – 1.45%
 Domingo Sánchez Sancho, Nicaraguan Socialist Party (PSN) – 1.31%
 Isidro Téllez, Marxist–Leninist Popular Action Movement (MAP-ML) – 1.03%

Esquipulas
The Esquipulas Peace Agreement was an initiative in the mid-1980s to settle the military conflicts that had plagued Central America for many years, and in some cases (notably Guatemala) for decades. It built upon groundwork laid by the Contadora Group from 1983 to 1985. The agreement was named for Esquipulas, Guatemala, where the initial meetings took place. The US Congress lobbying efforts were helped by one of Capitol Hill's top lobbyists, William C. Chasey.

In May 1986, a summit meeting, Esquipulas I, took place, attended by the five Central American presidents. On 15 February 1987, Costa Rican President Óscar Arias submitted a Peace Plan which evolved from this meeting. During 1986 and 1987, the Esquipulas Process was established, in which the Central American heads of state agreed on economic cooperation and a framework for peaceful conflict resolution. The Esquipulas II Accord emerged from this and was signed in Guatemala City by the five presidents on 7 August 1987.

Esquipulas II defined a number of measures to promote national reconciliation, an end to hostilities, democratization, free elections, the termination of all assistance to irregular forces, negotiations on arms controls, and assistance to refugees. It also laid the ground for international verification procedures and provided a timetable for implementation.

Sapoá Accords at March 23, 1988 initiated the peace process in Nicaragua. Name comes from the location, town of Sapoá near Costa Rican border. Sandinismo in 1988 had reached economical end point since Cold War (1985–1991) was coming to an end as Soviet Union was near the peak of Era of Stagnation limiting its support to Sandinistas. This in turn limited Sandinista government options to continue the conflict to favourable end and forcing them to negotiation for peace.
The Accords was mediated by João Clemente Baena Soares at the time as Secretary General of the Organization of American States and then Archbishop of Managua Miguel Obando y Bravo Since Nicaraguan conflict was one of the proxy war between Soviet Union and United States, peace process management relied also on then Soviet ambassador Vaino Väljas mediation depending on the recent US-Soviet agreements since US did not have any Ambassador assigned to Nicaragua from July 1, 1987 till May 4, 1988.

UNO

Nicaraguan historian and leading social investigator Roberto J. Cajina describes UNO as follows:

"Since the very moment of inception, under the political guidance and technical and financial support from the government of the US, the existence of UNO was marked by grave structural deformations, derived from its own nature. In its conformation concurred the most diverse currents of the Nicaraguan political and ideological range: from the liberal-conservative -traditionally anticommunist and pro-US, to marxist-leninists from moscovian lineage, openly declared supporters of class struggle and enemies of capitalism in its superior development stage".

The constitution of the UNO Coalition for the 1990 General Elections was as follows:
(exact transcription and translation of the names of these political parties needed)
3 Liberal factions: PLI, PLC and PALI
3 Conservative: ANC, PNC and APC
3 Social-Christians: PPSC, PDCN and PAN
2 Social democrats: PSD and MDN
2 Communists: PSN (pro-Moscow) and PC de Nicaragua (pro-Albania)
1 Central American Unionist: PIAC

See also

Cuban Revolution
Dirty War
Guatemalan Civil War
Iran–Contra affair
Murals of revolutionary Nicaragua
National Guard (Nicaragua)
Nicaragua v. United States
Salvadoran Civil War
Under Fire (film)
United States embargo against Nicaragua

References

Bibliography
Emily L Andrews, Active Marianismo: Women's social and political action in Nicaraguan Christian base communities and the Sandinista revolution. The Marianismo Ideal Grinnell College research project, 1997. Retrieved November 2009.
Enrique Bermudez (with Michael Johns), "The Contras' Valley Forge: How I View the Nicaragua Crisis", Policy Review magazine, Summer 1988.
David Close, Salvador Marti Puig & Shelley McConnell (2010) "The Sandinistas and Nicaragua, 1979–2009" NY: Lynne Rienner.
Dodson, Michael, and Laura Nuzzi O'Shaughnessy (1990). Nicaragua's Other Revolution: Religious Faith and Political Struggle. Chapel Hill, N.C.: University of North Carolina Press. 
 
Schmidli, William Michael, "'The Most Sophisticated Intervention We Have Seen': The Carter Administration and the Nicaraguan Crisis, 1978–1979," Diplomacy and Statecraft, (2012) 23#1 pp 66–86.
Sierakowski, Robert. Sandinistas: A Moral History. University of Notre Dame Press, 2019.

Primary sources
Katherine Hoyt, Memories of the 1979 Final Offensive, Nicanet, Retrieved November 2009. This is a first-hand account from Matagalpa; also contains some information on the general situation. Has photograph showing considerable damage to Matagalpa. News and Information
Salvador Martí Puig "Nicaragua. La revolución enredada" Lirbos de la Catarata: Madrid.
Oleg Ignatiev, "The Storm of Tiscapa", in Borovik and Ignatiev, The Agony of a Dictatorship. Progress Publishers, 1979; English translation, 1980.

Further reading
Meiselas, Susan. Nicaragua: June 1978 – July 1979. Pantheon Books (New York City), 1981. First Edition.
"Nicaragua: A People Aflame." GEO (Volume 1 charter issue), 1979.
Teixera, Ib. "Nicarágua: A Norte de um pais." Manchete (Rio de Janeiro). 7 July 1979.

External links
Library of Congress (United States), Country Study:Nicaragua, especially Chapter 1, which is by Marisabel Brás. Retrieved November 2009.
Louis Proyect, Nicaragua. Retrieved November 2009.
Nicaragua : Whose Side Are We On? from the Dean Peter Krogh Foreign Affairs Digital Archives

 
20th century in Nicaragua
20th-century revolutions
Cold War conflicts
Communism-based civil wars
Communist revolutions
History of Nicaragua
Revolution-based civil wars
Proxy wars